The Dalangshan Formation, also referred to as the Dalangshan Group is a geological formation in the Sanshui District of Guangdong Province, China, the strata of which date back to the Late Cretaceous period.

Dinosaur remains are among the fossils that have been recovered from the formation.

Vertebrate paleofauna 
 Heyuannia huangi - "Partial skull and skeleton."

See also 
 List of dinosaur-bearing rock formations
 Nanxiong Formation

References 

Geologic formations of China
Upper Cretaceous Series of Asia
Cretaceous China
Maastrichtian Stage
Fossiliferous stratigraphic units of Asia
Paleontology in Guangdong